Auður Íris Ólafsdóttir (born 29 August 1992) is an Icelandic basketball coach and player who is a former member of the Icelandic national basketball team. In 2019, she was named Úrvalsdeild Defensive Player of the Year.

Playing career

Club career
Auður Íris started her senior career with Haukar in 2009 and helped the team to the Úrvalsdeild finals in 2011, 2014 and 2016. After Haukar lost in the Úrvalsdeild finals in 2016, Auður signed with Skallagrímur. She left Skallagrímur in December, In January 2017, she signed with 1. deild kvenna club Breiðablik where she helped the club achieve promotion to the Úrvalsdeild. In 2018, she signed with Stjarnan and in 2019 she was named the Úrvalsdeild Defensive Player of the Year. After the season, she signed back with her hometown team of Haukar. In November 2019, it was reported that she had left the team after playing four games. In February 2020 she signed with 1. deild kvenna club Íþróttafélag Reykjavíkur.

In 7 August 2020, Auður signed with Úrvalsdeild club Valur.

National team career
Auður Íris debuted for the Icelandic national basketball team in 2015.

Coaching career
On 23 June 2021, Auður Íris was hired as the head coach of Stjarnan.

Personal life
Auður Íris is the daughter of Ólafur Rafnsson, the former president of FIBA Europe. Her younger sister, Sigrún Björg Ólafsdóttir, is a member of the Icelandic national team.

Trophies and awards

Trophies
Icelandic Cup: 2010, 2014
Icelandic Company Cup: 2011, 2015

Awards
Úrvalsdeild Defensive Player of the Year: 2019

References

External links
Icelandic statistics 2009–present

1992 births
Living people
Audur Iris Olafsdottir
Audur Iris Olafsdottir
Audur Iris Olafsdottir
Audur Iris Olafsdottir
Audur Iris Olafsdottir
Audur Iris Olafsdottir
Audur Iris Olafsdottir
Guards (basketball)
Audur Iris Olafsdottir